Lenko Grčić (26 March 1925 – 10 August 1999) was a Croatian footballer and coach.

Playing career
Born in Split, Grčić began his football career in 1940 with the juniors of RNK Split, where he continued to play until 1946. In 1946 he joined the Army and for three years was a regular for JRV Naša Krila based in Zemun, playing over 300 games for the club. In June 1950 after the 1949–1950 season, the club was dissolved and Grčić joined Hajduk Split and played for the club until 1956.

Managerial career
Grčić coached Croatian side Hajduk Split in 1963 and the Iraqi national side between 1976 and 1978.

References

1925 births
1999 deaths
Footballers from Split, Croatia
Association footballers not categorized by position
Yugoslav footballers
FK Naša Krila Zemun players
HNK Hajduk Split players
Yugoslav First League players
Yugoslav football managers
HNK Hajduk Split managers
ES Métlaoui managers
RNK Split managers
Iraq national football team managers
1976 AFC Asian Cup managers
Yugoslav expatriate football managers
Expatriate football managers in Tunisia
Yugoslav expatriate sportspeople in Tunisia
Expatriate football managers in Iraq
Yugoslav expatriate sportspeople in Iraq
Burials at Lovrinac Cemetery